Brazos County is a county in the U.S. state of Texas. As of the 2020 census, its population was 233,849. The county seat is Bryan. Along with Brazoria County, the county is named for the Brazos River, which forms its western border. The county was formed in 1841 and organized in 1843.

Brazos County is part of the Bryan-College Station Metropolitan Statistical Area, which consists of Bryan, College Station, and smaller cities and towns in Brazos, Burleson, and Robertson counties.

History

In 1837, most of the area of present-day Brazos County was included in Washington County. The Brazos River, which bisected the latter, proved a serious obstacle to county government, and a new county, Navasota, was formed in January 1841. The first court, with Judge R. E. B. Baylor presiding, was held later that year in the home of Joseph Ferguson, fourteen miles west of the site of present Bryan. The county seat, named Boonville for Mordecai Boon, was located on John Austin's league and was surveyed by Hiram Hanover in 1841. In January of the following year Navasota County was renamed Brazos County.

Originally one of the state's poorer counties, the county donated 2,416 acres of land in the 1870s to create Texas A&M University, which has enabled the county to be among the state's most financially successful.

After the Civil War tens of thousands of new residents moved to Brazos County, attracted by its good lands, with plenty of timber and a patchwork of prairies and fertile floodplains. As newcomers poured in by the thousands the county suffered from arson, feuding, shooting and racial violence, including mob lynchings.

Geography

Adjacent counties
 Robertson County (northwest)
 Leon County (north)
 Madison County (northeast)
 Grimes County (east)
 Washington County (south)
 Burleson County (southwest)

The northwest boundary follows the Old Spanish Trail.

Demographics

2020 census

Note: the US Census treats Hispanic/Latino as an ethnic category. This table excludes Latinos from the racial categories and assigns them to a separate category. Hispanics/Latinos can be of any race.

2000 census
As of the census of 2000, there were 152,415 people, 55,202 households, and 30,416 families residing in the county. The population density was 260 people per square mile (100/km2). There were 59,023 housing units at an average density of 101 per square mile (39/km2). The racial makeup of the county was 74.45% White, 10.72% Black or African American, 0.36% Native American, 4.01% Asian, 0.07% Pacific Islander, 8.42% from other races, and 1.97% from two or more races. 17.88% of the population were Hispanic or Latino of any race. 15.3% were of German, 8.4% English, 7.3% Irish and 7.2% American ancestry according to Census 2000.

There were 55,202 households, out of which 27.90% had children under the age of 18 living with them, 41.30% were married couples living together, 10.00% had a female householder with no husband present, and 44.90% were non-families. 25.50% of all households were made up of individuals, and 5.00% had someone living alone who was 65 years of age or older. The average household size was 2.52 and the average family size was 3.16.

In the county, the population was spread out, with 21.50% under the age of 18, 32.00% from 18 to 24, 26.00% from 25 to 44, 13.80% from 45 to 64, and 6.70% who were 65 years of age or older. The median age was 24 years. For every 100 females, there were 102.10 males. For every 100 females age 18 and over, there were 100.30 males.

The median income for a household in the county was $29,104, and the median income for a family was $46,530. Males had a median income of $32,864 versus $24,179 for females. The per capita income for the county was $16,212. About 14.00% of families and 26.90% of the population were below the poverty line, including 21.60% of those under age 18 and 10.30% of those age 65 or over.

Transportation

Public Transportation
The Brazos Transit District operates a fixed route bus service and paratransit throughout Bryan and College Station.

Major highways
  U.S. Highway 190
  State Highway 6
  State Highway 21
  State Highway 30
  State Highway 47

  State Highway OSR

Airport

Easterwood Airport, owned by Texas A&M, is the local commercial airport, with flights to Dallas/Fort Worth International Airport.

Coulter Field is in Bryan.

Politics
Unlike most counties that are home to a large university, Brazos County is a Republican stronghold, perhaps reflecting the political views of influential Texas A&M alumni and families of the student body. No Democratic presidential nominee has carried it since Texas native Lyndon Johnson in his 1964 landslide. In 2020, Joe Biden was the first Democrat to win over 40% of its vote since 1968.

Communities

Cities
 Bryan (county seat)
 College Station
 Navasota (partial)
 Wixon Valley

Towns
 Kurten

Census-designated place
 Lake Bryan

Unincorporated communities
 Allenfarm
 Cawthon
 Edge
 Fairview
 Harvey
 Millican - Former municipality
 Mooring
 Mudville
 Nelleva
 Peach Creek
 Smetana
 Tabor
 Wellborn

Ghost Towns
 Boonville
 Cottonwood
 Dallam
 Dinkins
 Enright
 Macey
 Moore
 Reliance
 Sims
 Stone City
 Union
 Varisco
 Wicker
 Zack

Education
School districts:
 Bryan Independent School District
 College Station Independent School District
 Navasota Independent School District

Blinn College is the designated community college for all of the county.

See also

 National Register of Historic Places listings in Brazos County, Texas
 Recorded Texas Historic Landmarks in Brazos County

References

External links
 Brazos County government
 Brazos County AgriLife Extension office
 Brazos County Attorney's Office
 
 Brazos County from the  Texas Almanac
 Brazos County from the TXGenWeb Project
 Historic Brazos County materials, hosted by the Portal to Texas History

 
1843 establishments in the Republic of Texas
Populated places established in 1843
Bryan–College Station